Puchshinnubie Creek is a stream in the U.S. state of Mississippi.

Puchshinnubie Creek most likely was named after a Choctaw chieftain. Variant names are "Bucksnubby Branch", "Puchshennubee", "Puchshenubbie", "Puchshenubee", "Puchshenubie", "Puchshinnubie", "Puchshinubbie", "Puchshinubee", "Puchshinubie", "Puchshunerbie Creek", "Puckshennubie", "Puckshenubbie", "Puckshenubeev", "Puckshenubie", "Puckshinnubiev", "Puckshinubbie", "Puckshinubee", and "Puckshinubie Creek".

References

Rivers of Mississippi
Rivers of Carroll County, Mississippi
Mississippi placenames of Native American origin